The Rajyotsava Prashasti or  Rajyotsava Awards, the second highest civilian honor of the Karnataka state of India are conferred annually by the Karnataka Government on the occasion of the establishment of the state on 1 November celebrated as the Kannada Rajyotsava.

The awards are presented in Bengaluru by the Chief Minister of Karnataka on 1 November of every year. Each award carries an amount of 100,000, a 20-gram gold medal and a citation. In addition to that, the government has in the past, allotted commercial land for eligible awardees.

Recipients
Between 1991–1999 the award was given to—

References

Lists of Indian award winners
Awards established in 1966
Recipients of the Rajyotsava Award